Budihal is a town in Chitradurga district in the southern state of Karnataka, India, in the subdistrict of Hosadurga.

References

Villages in Chitradurga district